Siraj ud Daula College is located in FC Area (Federal B.Area)  of Karachi, Sindh, Pakistan. It is affiliated with the University of Karachi. The college offers undergraduate Bachelor of Commerce, the degree is offered in Commonwealths nations. The curriculum is usually concentrated on one subject area — such as accounting, actuarial science, business management, corporate governance, human resource management, economics, statistics, finance, marketing or supply chain management — and emphasizes underlying theory.

It is named after Nawab Siraj ud-Daulah who was the last independent Nawab of Bengal.

Principals

Prof Syed Mujtaba Hussain
Prof Dr Conl Sughra
Prof Shuja Ahmad Zeba
Prof Mir Himid Ali ٭
Prof Saleman Qadar Hameedi
prof Raees Alvi ٭
Prof Chaudry Mateen
Prof Ghulam Sabir ٭
Prof Dr Ghulam Abbas Qadiri ٭
Prof Dr S Afzal Bukhari(11 years vocational permanent) ٭
Prof Maqbool Ahmad (Incharge)
Prof Shahid Iqbal (Incharge)
Prof Syed Moeenuddin Peerzada (Incharge)

See also
 Adamjee Government Science College

References

Universities and colleges in Karachi